Boulenophrys parva is a species of horned frog found in South Asia and Southeast Asia, from eastern India and Nepal through Bangladesh and Burma to western Thailand and southern China (Yunnan and Guangxi) and northern Laos and Vietnam. Perhaps because of its wide distribution, Boulenophrys parva is known under many common names, including concave-crowned horned toad, lesser stream horned frog, mountain horned frog, brown horn frog, Burmese spadefoot toad, and small spadefoot toad. It inhabits evergreen broadleaf forests alongside streams.

Males measure  and females  in length.

References

parva
Amphibians of Bangladesh
Amphibians of Bhutan
Amphibians of Myanmar
Amphibians of China
Frogs of India
Amphibians of Laos
Amphibians of Nepal
Amphibians of Thailand
Amphibians of Vietnam
Amphibians described in 1893
Taxa named by George Albert Boulenger